"We Trying to Stay Alive" is the first single released from Wyclef Jean's debut solo album, The Carnival. The song features raps by John Forté and Pras (of the Fugees) and samples the 1977 Bee Gees hit "Stayin' Alive" and Audio Two's "Top Billin'" (1987). The video version also contains an interpolation of the main melody of "Trans-Europe Express" by "Kraftwerk". In the US, it reached number 45 on the Billboard Hot 100 chart. Additionally, it reached number three on the Hot Rap Songs chart and number 14 on the Hot R&B/Hip-Hop Songs chart. The track reached number 87 on VH1's "100 Greatest Hip-Hop Songs of All Time".

Reception
While the sampling of the Bee Gees hit "Stayin' Alive" was green lighted by the Bee Gee's management, the final song was not warmly received by the Bee Gees themselves. "I have to say I do not like anyone sampling our voices." Barry Gibb told MTV News in regards to the song. "Don't like it. Don't approve of it. Don't like it."

Music video

The official music video for the song was directed by Roman Coppola.

Track listing
 UK CD1 (664681 2)
 "We Trying to Stay Alive" (LP Version)
 "We Trying to Stay Alive" (Instrumental)
 "Anything Can Happen" (LP Version)
 "Anything Can Happen" (Instrumental)

 UK CD2 (664681 5)
 "We Trying to Stay Alive" (LP Version)
 "We Trying to Stay Alive" (Salaam Remi Remix)
 "Imagino" (Creole Version)
 "Flavor from the Carnival" (LP Snippets)

Chart performance
We Trying to Stay Alive peaked at number 45 on the US Billboard Hot 100 chart and spent a total of 12 weeks on the chart. It also peaked at number 14 on the Hot R&B/Hip-Hop Songs chart and number three on the Hot Rap Songs chart. In the UK, the song peaked at number 13 on the UK Singles Chart and spent a total of 5 weeks on the chart.

Charts

Weekly charts

Year-end charts

References

1997 songs
1997 debut singles
Wyclef Jean songs
Music videos directed by Roman Coppola
Songs written by Wyclef Jean
Songs written by Barry Gibb
Songs written by Maurice Gibb
Songs written by Robin Gibb
Song recordings produced by Jerry Duplessis
Song recordings produced by Wyclef Jean
Columbia Records singles
Sampling controversies